Liptenara hiendlmayri is a butterfly in the family Lycaenidae. It is found in the Republic of Congo, the Democratic Republic of Congo (Lulua and Sankuru) and Uganda (from the western part of the country to the Bwamba and Budongo forests).

References

Butterflies described in 1887
Poritiinae
Taxa named by Hermann Dewitz
Butterflies of Africa